The Olympus OM-D E-M10 was the third model in the OM-D series of compact, mirrorless, interchangeable-lens cameras. It is of the Micro Four Thirds type and was introduced in January 2014.

The model was aimed at a lower price point in the market than the preceding OM-D E-M5 and OM-D E-M1 models. Some features of the previous models were not included, such as weather sealing and the E-M10 had only a 3-way image stabilizer instead of the other models' 5-way stabilizer.

The E-M10 used the BLS-1 battery first supplied with the earlier E-P1/2 compact mirrorless cameras rather than the BLN-1 used by the OM-D E-M5 as well as E-M1 models.

It was succeeded by the Olympus OM-D E-M10 Mark II in 2015.

Specification and features 
 Sensor: 16MP Live MOS sensor without AA filter
 Image stabilisation: 3-axis image stabilisation 
 Tilting LCD screen, with capacitive touchscreen operation
 TruePic VII processor with lens correction
 ISO range: 200 - 25600
 Manual focus (with focus peaking)
 Focus points: 81-area multiple AF (Contrast detection AF)
 In-camera HDR
 Flash: built-in flash, hot shoe
 Flash sync: 1/250 sec.
 Built-in wifi: 802.11 b/g/n for remote shooting (smartphone, tablet)
 Customisable buttons: 3 on top + arrow keys
 Ports: SDHC/XC, AV/USB, HDMI connector
 Remote control: optional (RM-UC1 Remote Cable) or via built-in Wifi and Olympus smartphone application
 Optional Grip (ECG-1)
 Art Filters: Pop Art, Soft Focus, Pale & Light Color, Light Tone, Grainy Film, Pin Hole, Diorama, Cross Process, Gentle Sepia, Dramatic Tone, Key Line, Watercolor
 Current Firmware: Version 1.4 (December 2018)

References

External links 
 Official Website
 Micro Four Thirds Lenses and Lens Accessories
  DPReview
  Imaging Resource
 Manual (English, Spanish, French)
 Review by Derrick Story, The Digital Story Podcast
 No AA filter on E-M10's sensor confirmed by Olympus (German)

OM-D E-M1
Cameras introduced in 2014